Anna Nikolayevna Kalinskaya (born 2 December 1998) is a Russian professional tennis player. Ranked by the Women's Tennis Association (WTA), she reached a career-high of No. 51 as a singles player in September 2022, and No. 49 as a doubles player in February 2023. On the WTA Tour she won three doubles and seven singles titles;  on the ITF Women's Circuit she won nine doubles titles.

Her promising career started at age 17 when she won the Grand Slam girls' doubles title at the 2016 Australian Open alongside Tereza Mihalíková. She had previously reached the finals in the 2015 French Open in the girls' singles event as well as the 2015 US Open final in the doubles event, alongside her compatriot Anastasia Potapova.

In 2017, she defeated former US Open champion Sloane Stephens in the first round of the tournament, achieving her first Grand Slam victory. In 2022, she and American Caty McNally won the doubles tennis title at the St. Petersburg Ladies' Trophy.

Junior career

Kalinskaya was very successful as a junior with a highest combined junior ranking of No. 3. She won a total of sixteen titles: eight in singles events and eight in doubles. Her most significant title was the 2016 Australian Open in doubles. In addition, she reached the finals of both the 2015 French Open in singles and the 2015 US Open in doubles.

Singles
In 2012, she won the Grade-5 Green Cup at her first singles event on the ITF Junior Circuit. In 2013, Kalinskaya reached the quarterfinals of the Grade-2 tournament in Šiauliai and the semifinals of the Grade-2 tournament in Kazan. She won her second singles title at the Grade-3 tournament in Almaty and her third singles title at the Grade-4 Riga event. She advanced to the finals of the Grade-4 Tallinn tournament, but finished runner-up. By the end of the year, she won the title at the Grade- 3 Larnaca tournament and finished runner-up at the Grade-3 tournament in Nonthaburi.

Her journey and progress continued into the 2014 season when she won the Grade-2 Bratislava tournament, defeating Viktória Kužmová, who later became her doubles partner in senior events. With Kužmová, she won her first doubles title in 2019. In March, she won the Grade-2 Šiauliai tournament, followed up then with final of the Grade-2 Kazan. At the 2014 French Open she made her Grand Slam debut but was eliminated in the first round. Still it did not demotivated her since she then reached semifinals of the Grade-2 Moscow tournament and then the final of the Grade-1 Berlin tournament. Still got even better in late August, given that she won her first Grade-1 title in Colle Park. Despite early loss at her major debut, Kalinskaya redeemed herself with the quarterfinal of the US Open. In late October, she reached quarterfinals of the significant Grade-A tournament, the Osaka Mayor's Cup.   

In March 2015, she started season with two Grade-1 quarterfinals in Kazan and Beaulieu-sur-Mer, respectively. She then made her debut at the Grade-A Trofeo Bonfiglio but lost in the second round to Katherine Sebov. Kalinskaya hit her peek at her French Open debut as she advanced to the final. In the final, she lost to Paula Badosa in the straight sets. In late August 2015, she won the title at the Grade-1 College Park, where she also was defending champion. During the year she was also eliminated in the first rounds of Wimbledon and the US Open. In 2016, Kalinskaya played only two tournaments. Her first tournament of the year was the Grade-1 Traralgon tournament where she lost to Vera Lapko in the final. She finished her singles junior career with a quarterfinal at the 2016 Australian Open, losing again to Lapko.

Doubles
Kalinskaya was nothing less than successful in doubles events. Her first final was in March 2013 on the Grade-2 Šiauliai tournament. The following week she was advanced in the another final but still without a title. In September 2013, she won her first title at the Grade-3 Larnaca alongside Gyulnara Nazarova. 

Her 2014 season started with the title at the Grade-2 Bratislava. The following week she went even further, winning her first Grade-1 Přerov tournament. A month later, third title of the year was at the Grade-2 Šiauliai tournament. All these three titles she won alongside Evgeniya Levashova. In late May, she reached final of the Grade-1 Charleroi tournament. At the 2014 French Open, she made her doubles Grand Slam main-draw debut but lost in the first round. In late June, she won the Grade-2 Moscow tournament. She did not stop with winning her titles after winning new one in August at the Grade-1 College Park. At the US Open, she lost in the second round. Later, she made her doubles debut at the Osaka Mayor's Cup and get to the semifinals. 

During the first half of 2015, Kalinskaya did not shine with results. However, things get better in August at the Grade-1 College Park where she defended her title. Her next stop was at the US Open where she reached her first Grand Slam final in doubles. Alongside Anastasia Potapova, she lost to Kužmová and Aleksandra Pospelova. She finished her doubles junior career with the title at the 2016 Australian Open that she won together with Tereza Mihalíková.

Professional career

2014–15: Professional debut

Singles

Kalinskaya attempted her WTA Tour debut at the Premier-level 2014 Kremlin Cup at the age of 15. After receiving a qualifying wildcard, she lost to her compatriot and wildcard player Polina Monova. In January 2015, she started playing on the ITF Women's Circuit. After her first two $25k tournaments in the United States, she progressed at tournaments in Turkey. She first played at the $10k Antalya tournament where she recorded her first win as a senior, defeating Turkish player Cempre Anil. She continued in the same city the following week, reaching her first final, losing to Lu Jiajing. That year she made her debut in the WTA rankings as world No. 1201.

After two $25 tournaments in Moscow, Kalinskaya attempted another WTA Tour debut at the Kremlin Cup where she received a qualifying wildcard. She lost in the final stage to eventual semifinalist Daria Kasatkina. By the end of the year, she played two $10k tournaments in Port El Kantaoui. She reached the semifinals in the first and got to the finals of the second where she was forced to give a walkover to Ema Burgić Bucko. The result pushed her into the top 600.

Doubles
Her professional doubles career started well, winning the $25k Sunrise tournament. This result put her on the WTA rankings in doubles, getting into the top 700. She played only four more ITF tournaments without considerable success.

2016: Success on the ITF Women's Circuit

Singles
In early February, Kalinskaya had new chance to debut at the WTA Tour. As a wildcard player, she played in the qualifying of the Premier-level St. Petersburg Ladies Trophy but lost to Kateřina Siniaková. After that, her raising happened at several ITF tournaments. In late March, she reached final of the $10k tournament in Manama where she lost to Mihalíková. A month later, she triumphed at the $10k Shymkent event, winning every match in straight sets. In June, she had success in Belarus where she first won the $25k Minsk tournament, followed up with a final in the same city but was forced to retire during the second set.

Her third ITF title of the year came in July at the $25k event in Aschaffenburg where she was better than Dalila Jakupović in a three-set match. In August, Kalinskaya won her fourth title of the year at the $25k Kharkiv tournament. All these results helped her entering the top 200 in September. At the Kremlin Cup, she made her WTA Tour debut after receiving wildcard for the third year-in-a-row but this time in the main draw but lost in the first round to Kristina Mladenovic. She finished year with the $25k Minsk final but let her opponent win without playing. As a result, she started a new phase in her career, which is the gradual transition onto the main tour. Since her top 200 debut in September, she spend rest of the year inside there.

Doubles
Kalinskaya started her doubles season winning the title at the $10k Manama tournament in April. A month later, a she won the $100k Trnava tournament, her first significant ITF title in both events. During summer, she won two $25k events in Minsk and Darmstadt, respectively. At the Kremlin Cup, she made her WTA Tour doubles debut and recorded her first win. In November, she won another $25k title in Minsk. As a result, she made her debut in the top 150.

2017: Transition to WTA Tour, Fed Cup debut

Singles

Kalinskaya started the year as a top 200 player, making her debut in a Grand Slam qualifying at the Australian Open. Her first opponent was top seed Stefanie Vögele, to whom she lost in a three-set match. She was handed a wildcard into the main draw of the St. Petersburg Ladies' Trophy, and was beaten by Daria Gavrilova in the first round. In early March, at the Malaysian Open, she recorded her first tour-level main-draw win, defeating top 30 player Caroline Garcia in straight sets. Still finding her way to the top 100, she was forced to play ITF tournaments as well. She traveled to China to play at two $60k tournaments. Her first destination was Zhuhai where she was eliminated in the first round by former top-10 player Patty Schnyder. The following week, she headed to Shenzhen where she reached semifinals, in which she faced compatriot Ekaterina Alexandrova and failed to make a triumph.

From April until September, Kalinskaya played in Europe. While not having success at ITF tournaments in France and Germany, things got a bit better on the WTA Tour. She reached two second rounds; at the Istanbul Cup in late April and the Gstaad Open in July. In addition, she lost in the first round of qualifying of both the French Open and Wimbledon.

After being knocked out in the first round of the US Open qualifying, she traveled to Georgia where she finished runner-up in the $25k Batumi Ladies Open. However, she struggled again, after reaching second round of the $100k Neva Cup in St. Petersburg, loss in qualifying of the Tashkent Open and first round of the $25k Óbidos event. Despite early loss in Óbidos, Kalinskaya stayed there and won another one the following week defeating Magdalena Fręch in the final. Third one was promising as well, but she was forced to retire, after losing first set to Katie Swan. Without any oscillations in WTA ranking, Kalinskaya spentr inside top 200. On June 12th, she reached her then-career high of No. 127.

Doubles
Her doubles performances during the year were primarily on the ITF Circuit. In the first two months she reached two semifinals, at the $60k Andrézieux-Bouthéon in January and $25k Altenkirchen events in February. In the meantime, in February, she played in the quarterfinals of the St. Petersburg Ladies' Trophy and made her debut at the Fed Cup in doubles. In July, she advanced to her first WTA Tour semifinal, after winning two matches alongside Evgeniya Rodina. Two weeks later, she won the $25k+H Bad Saulgau tournament with İpek Soylu. On 16 October 2017, she achieved a new career-high of 114.

2018: Grand Slam debut

Singles

Given her ranking, Kalinskaya often switch between ITF and WTA Tour during the year. She started year with playing in the Australia. Her first tournament was the $25k Playford International but she lost in the first round to Jessika Ponchet. She then shifted to Melbourne to play at the Australian Open qualifying. She succeeded to reach the main-draw for the first time in her career. Her first opponent in the main-draw was Camila Giorgi but Kalinskaya lost in the two sets. During the February, she failed in qualifying of two WTA tournaments (St. Petersburg Ladies' Trophy and Hungarian Ladies Open) but in the meantime made her singles debut at the Billie Jean King Cup. She lost in the three sets to slovak player Magdaléna Rybáriková in Bratislava. For Kalinskaya March was marked with good performances at the ITF Circuit. She first played at the $60k Zhuhai tournament and reached semifinal, followed up then with final of the $60k Shenzhen tournament. Her last tournament in March was the $60k Croissy-Beaubourg where she was advanced into the semifinals. 

During the following five months (since April until September), she did not draw attention on herself. Along with most early losses, she reached semifinal of the $100k Contrexéville Open during the middle of the July. In addition, she lost in the final stage of qualifying in both French Open and Wimbledon.

Some sign of progress were seen in the early September, when she made the main draw of the US Open for the first time in her career. In the first round, she was defeated by world No.9, Julia Görges, in three sets. Since then, new struggling happened for her with easy losses to Olga Danilović in the first round of the Tashkent Open and to Natalia Vikhlyantseva at the Linz Open qualifying. Next, she made another appearance at the Kremlin Cup as a wildcard, but was ousted by Mladenovic in a repeat of their 2016 encounter on the exact same stage. Despite not reaching any new career highest singles ranking, she spend all year inside top 200.

Doubles
Switch between ITF Circuit and WTA Tour was seen also in doubles. After a few early losses during the first two months, she won title at the $60k Shenzhen alongside Viktória Kužmová. Two weeks later, she won another $60k title, this time in Croissy-Beaubourg, again with Kužmová. A month later, she get to the semifinal of the Istanbul Cup where she played with compatriot Natela Dzalamidze. At the French Open she made her Grand Slam debut in doubles but lost in the first round together with Ekaterina Makarova. Wimbledon did not end well after losing in the second round of qualifying. She finished year with semifinal of the Kremlin Cup. On 28 May 2018, she reached her then-career high ranking of No. 106.

2019: First WTA Tour semifinal, first top-10 win, top 100 debut

Singles
Kalinskaya started the year with a triumph at the $25k event Playford International, defeating Elena Rybakina in the final. Her array of victories continued with getting three more in the qualifying of the Australian Open. As a result, she advanced to the main draw but was defeated by world No. 11, Aryna Sabalenka, in the first round. She then struggled to reach WTA Tour main draw at many tournaments including the Premier-level St. Petersburg Ladies' Trophy, Qatar Open and Stuttgart Open. In the middle of May, she won $60k Open Saint-Gaudens defeating Ana Bogdan in the final. Still being in France, Kalinskaya tried once more to enter the main draw at the French Open, the only major where she still has not managed it. But for the third year in-a-row, she failed in qualifying.

As a warm-up for the grass-court season, Kalinskya played at the $100k Surbiton Trophy. After defeating Ivana Jorović in the first round, she lost to Rybáriková in a three-sets match. Right after that, she traveled to the Netherlands to play at the Rosmalen Championships. Despite losing in the first round, it was her first WTA Tour main-draw performance of the year. Preparing for Wimbledon, she played at the Birmingham Classic but was stopped in the final stage of qualifying, and around this time she hired Patricia Tarabini to be her coach. Still looking for first Grand Slam match win, she had some hopes at Wimbledon, given that she passed qualifying after three straight-sets wins. She failed to achieve it after losing to Magda Linette in the first round.

During August, she had an impressive North American hardcourt swing, reaching semifinals of a WTA event for the first time in her career at the Washington Open. She survived the qualifying rounds, before producing a huge comeback against reigning Olympic champion Monica Puig and stunning Mladenovic for her first win over the Frenchwoman in three attempts. Her run was stopped by eventual champion Jessica Pegula in the semifinals. At the US Open, Kalinskaya prevailed in qualifying once again. In the first round, she stunned world No. 10, Sloane Stephens, on her Arthur Ashe Stadium debut, winning in straight sets. However, she was unable to back up her win as she was defeated by wildcard Kristie Ahn in her next match.

In late September, another WTA quarterfinal soon followed at the Tashkent Open, where she beat Tatjana Maria en route. Despite losing quarterfinal match after only winning two games against Katarina Zavatska, she secured top 100 debut right after that. Two weeks later, she played at the Kremlin Cup with which she closed her season. In the first round, she defeated compatriot Anastasia Potapova but then lost to another one, Ekaterina Alexandrova.

Doubles

Kalinskaya started well with doubles events from start. On her first event, the St. Petersburg Ladies' Trophy, she get to the final alongside Kužmová. In late April, she played again together at the Prague Open and triumphed. They get title after defeating two top 15 players Květa Peschke and Nicole Melichar. It was the first WTA title of any kind for Kalinskaya. Despite good results on the WTA Tour, two weeks later, she played at the $60k Saint-Gaudens and finished runner-up alongside Sofya Lansere. Her American journey started well as she reached semifinals of the Washington Open alongside Miyu Kato. Her next stop was at the US Open where she reached third round. Alongside Yulia Putintseva, she lost to top seeds Tímea Babos and Mladenovic. It was the first time for Kalinskaya to reach a major third round in either of two events. Just like in singles, it was first season for Kalinskaya to be inside top 100 in doubles. She reached No. 72 in late September.

2020: Pandemic-affected season
Given the lack of tournaments due to COVID-19 pandemic, Kalinskaya was not seen so often during the season. Her season began with the Australian Open, where she qualified for the main draw after saving match points to beat Wang Xinyu in the final qualifying round. In the first round of main-draw, she faced unseeded player Zheng Saisai but it was not enough for Kalinskaya to pass through. Before the cancellation of the tennis in March due to COVID-19, Kalinskaya lost in the first round of the Mexican Open, followed up then with another first round loss but this time at the WTA Challenger Indian Wells.

Upon the resumption of the tour in August, she qualified for the main draw of the Lexington Challenger, after defeating two American players. In the main draw, she lost to Jil Teichmann. New qualification happened on the following Premier 5 Cincinnati Open. It was her first time to reach the main draw of a Premier 5/Mandatory tournament but she fell in the first round to Marie Bouzková, in straight sets. At the US Open, Kalinskaya beat Nina Stojanović to reach the second round for the second consecutive year, but then lost to 20th seed Karolína Muchová there. She tried to qualify for another Premier 5 tournament, the Italian Open, but lost in the final stage of qualifying. In late September, she finished season with the main-draw first-round loss at the postponed French Open. Despite that, she completed at least one main-draw performance at all four majors. During the year, Kalinskaya did not have so many ups and downs in her rankings, started year as No. 104 and sank to No. 117 in August as her lowest in the season.

2021: Struggles followed by resurgence

Singles

At the first three tournaments, she struggled with results. Her season started with the Premier Gippsland Trophy as part of the Australian Open warm-up but was eliminated in the first round by Katie Boulter. Due to low ranking, she was forced to play in the qualifying of Australian Open. She started well with winning her first match there but then was unable to qualify for the main draw of the Australian Open as she was stunned by Clara Burel in three sets. The third tournament was the Abierto Zapopan in Guadalajara where she lost to Leylah Fernandez.

Right after weak performances, her resurgence began at the Monterrey Open where she reached the quarterfinals as a qualifier, after beating second seed Nadia Podoroska in the first round. Her run continued the following week as a wildcard at the Miami Open, where she reached the third round of a WTA 1000 tournament for the first time in her career and lost to 12th seed Garbiñe Muguruza, despite leading 3-0 in the deciding set. Her struggling continued with first-round loss at the Copa Colsanitas and failing to reach main draw of the Madrid Open. However, in late May, she defeated former top-10 Kristina Mladenovic in the first round of the Serbia Open. While being eliminated in the first round of qualifying at the French Open, she managed to qualify at Wimbledon. Kalinskaya qualified for the main draw for the second successive time, after beating Priscilla Hon from 0-3 down in the decider. In the main draw ,she lost to another qualifier, Camila Osorio. At the US Open, she lost in the second round of qualifying to Valentini Grammatikopoulou. In that way, she ended her three in-a-row streak there in the main draw.

After falling to No. 151 in the singles rankings in October, Kalinskaya returned with a fourth-round appearance at the Indian Wells Open as a qualifier, scoring her third top-50 win of the year over Sara Sorribes Tormo in the process. In the fourth round, she lost to Ons Jabeur. The following week, she qualified for the main draw at the Kremlin Cup, but was forced to retire in the second round against Maria Sakkari due to an injury. The Russian ended her season with a quarterfinal appearance at the Courmayeur Ladies Open, beating sixth seed Alison Riske along the way.

Doubles
At the Yarra Valley Classic, as her first doubles event of the year, she made it into the final alongside Kužmová which they lost to Japanese combination Ena Shibahara and Shuko Aoyama. Things got good as well at the Australian Open as she reached her first third round there (her second at any major). At the French Open, she was eliminated in the first round but went one step further at Wimbledon. Despite losing in the first round of the US Open, it was her first season that she played all four majors. In the second half of September, she won her second WTA Tour doubles title at the Slovenia Open, alongside Mihalíková. On 22 February 2021, she reached a career-high doubles ranking of 69.

2022: New career-high rankings, second top 10 win

Singles
Kalinskaya started season with the qualifying of the Melbourne Summer Set. In the main draw, she was forced to retire during the second set against her compatriot Daria Kasatkina. As a leading seed at the Australian Open qualifying, she lost in straight sets to Andrea Lázaro García. Her struggling continued at the St. Petersburg Ladies' Trophy where she lost in the final stage of qualifying.

At the next three tournaments, Kalinskaya made progress. Ranked as a No. 100 player, she defeated three better ranked players at the Abierto Zapopan in Guadalajara and reached semifinals. In the semifinal match against Stephens, she won the first set against eventual champion but retired after the second set when opponent made a turnover. The second good result came at the Indian Wells Open, where she won two qualifying matches and achieved main-draw wins against two French players, Harmony Tan and Alizé Cornet. Despite winning the first set against Sorana Cîrstea in the third round, she lost another two sets, winning only one game. Same situation happened at the Miami Open, reaching the third round after qualifying but this time, she did a walkover before the third-round match against Lucia Bronzetti. Previously, in the second round, she defeated world No. 6, Karolína Plíšková, in order to make her second top-10 win. 

Her first Grand Slam main-draw appearance of the year was at the French Open. Being in the top 100, she secured an automatic place in the main draw but lost to Madison Keys. Her grass-court season started with two second rounds (Rosmalen Championships and German Open) at both being eliminated by Belinda Bencic. She was suspended for playing at Wimbledon due to the Russian players ban, resulting from the Russian invasion in Ukraine. On 18 July 2022, she reached a career-high singles ranking of world No. 70, after losing in the second round of the Ladies Open Lusanne. She lost to Danilović despite having a match point.

Following a second round showing at the US Open she reached a new career high ranking of No. 51 on 12 September 2022.
At the WTA 1000 Guadalajara Open, she defeated ninth seed Barbora Krejcikova, her third top-20 win of the season, Elise Mertens, and seventh seed Daria Kasatkina, her fourth top-20 win, to reach the quarterfinals for the first time at this level.

Doubles
Season started well for Kalinskaya as she won the title at the St. Petersburg Ladies' Trophy together with Caty McNally. On 11 July 2022, she reached a career-high doubles ranking of world No. 65. Again with McNally, in August, she lost the final of the Washington Open.

National representation

Billie Jean King Cup

She received her first Fed Cup nomination for the Russia Fed Cup team in the 2017 Fed Cup World Group II, but was only selected for the dead doubles rubber, which she triumphed alongside Anna Blinkova.

She made her Fed Cup live rubber debut at the 2018 Fed Cup World Group II, falling to veteran Magdaléna Rybáriková.

Kalinskaya once again represented Russia at the 2020 Billie Jean King Cup, sealing a spot for her country in the Finals after partnering Anna Blinkova to seal the decisive doubles rubber.

Performance timelines

Only main-draw results in WTA Tour, Grand Slam tournaments, Fed Cup/Billie Jean King Cup and Olympic Games are included in win–loss records.

Singles
Current through the 2023 Indian Wells Open.

Doubles
Current through the 2023 Australian Open.

WTA career finals

Doubles: 6 (3 titles, 3 runner-ups)

ITF Circuit finals

Singles: 15 (7 titles, 8 runner–ups)

Doubles: 10 (9 titles, 1 runner–up)

Junior Grand Slam finals

Girls' singles: 1 (runner–up)

Girls' doubles: 2 (1 title, 1 runner–up)

Fed Cup/Billie Jean King Cup participation

Singles: 1 (0–1)

Doubles: 3 (2–1)

WTA Tour career earnings
current as of 23 May 2022

Head-to-head records

Record against top 10 players
Kalinskaya's record against players who have been ranked in the top 10. Active players are in boldface.

Top-10 wins

Notes

References

External links

 
 
 
 
 

1998 births
Living people
Russian female tennis players
Tennis players from Moscow
Australian Open (tennis) junior champions
Grand Slam (tennis) champions in girls' doubles